Best III may refer to:

 Best III (Akina Nakamori album), 1992
 Best III (computer), a Russian ZX Spectrum clone
The Best III: Fuck the System Jazz, an album by Elektropartizany, 2013